Thomas Burgoyne may refer to:
 Thomas Burgoyne (cricketer, born 1775) (1775–1847), English cricketer
 Thomas Burgoyne junior (1805–1879), his son, English cricketer
 Thomas Burgoyne (Australian politician) (1827–1920), builder and politician in the colony of South Australia
Thomas Burgoyne (Bere Alston MP), member of parliament for Bere Alston
Thomas Burgoyne (Cambridgeshire MP), member of parliament for Cambridgeshire